Gabriel "Gabe" Robinson (born February 5, 1995) is an American soccer player who plays as a defender for Los Angeles Force.

References

External links
Profile at CSUN Athletics

1995 births
Living people
American soccer players
American people of Guatemalan descent
American sportspeople of North American descent
Sportspeople of Guatemalan descent
Association football defenders
Cal State Northridge Matadors men's soccer players
Las Vegas Lights FC players
Colorado Springs Switchbacks FC players
People from Valencia, Santa Clarita, California
Soccer players from California
Sportspeople from Santa Clarita, California
USL Championship players